Rowley is an industrial area in Tooele County, Utah, United States. Rowley sits on the western shore of the Great Salt Lake, approximately 15 miles (by road) north of I-80, Exit 77, serving Timpie/Rowley Junction.

Rowley was created in 1970 as the site of a large magnesium processing plant.  The location was named after Jeff Rowley who was the CEO of National Lead Industries during the construction of the plant.  In the mid-70s, National Lead Industries changed its name to NL Industries and in 1980 sold the plant to AMAX.  In 1989, the facility was sold to the Renco Group, and the facility renamed Magnesium Corporation of America aka Magcorp.  
This facility was identified by the EPA as a major air polluter in the 1990s In 2001, Magcorp went bankrupt and the Renco group purchased the assets and formed US Magnesium.  In 2005, the facility was investigated by the CDC for worker health hazards.

Since 2012, Rowley is the site of a titanium smelter plant run by Allegheny Technologies. It is adjacent to the US Magnesium plant. The facility was idled at least in September 2016 because the metal could be procured on the market at a cost lower than the production cost at ATI, The ATI plant was announced in 2006, and budgeted at $325 million. and in the end cost $460 million.

References

Tooele County, Utah